Erik Lindell (born 14 February 1996) is a Swedish football midfielder who plays for Degerfors IF.

References

1996 births
Living people
Swedish footballers
Association football midfielders
IFK Norrköping players
IF Sylvia players
Degerfors IF players
Superettan players
Allsvenskan players
Sportspeople from Norrköping
Footballers from Östergötland County